Round Towers Lusk is a Gaelic Athletic Association club based at Lusk, County Dublin, Ireland, serving Lusk and its surrounding areas.

As of 2019, the club fields teams from under 9's to under 18's for both boys and girls, while at adult level the club has three football teams competing in AFL2, AFL6 and AFL11N and the Dublin Senior Football Championship and one ladies football team. They have one Junior Hurling Team competing in AHL7

History
Irish Volunteer Thomas Ashe founded the GAA club when a primary teacher in the local school. He died on hunger strike protesting inhuman treatment by British forces in Ireland in 1917.

Achievements
 Dublin Junior Football Championship Winners 1962, 1992, 2015
 Dublin Intermediate Football Championship Winners 2018
 Dublin Junior 4 All County Football Championship Winners 2018
 Dublin Under 21 B Football Championship: Winner 2017
 Dublin AFL Div. 4 Winners 2016
 Dublin AFL Div. 5 Winners 2015
 Dublin AFL Div. 11 North Winners 2011
 Dublin Junior Hurling Championship: Winners 1951
 Dublin Senior B Football Championship: Winners 2019

References

External links
Official Round Towers Lusk Website
Official Dublin GAA Website
GAA Website

Gaelic games clubs in Fingal
Gaelic football clubs in Fingal
1906 establishments in Ireland